Coleophora amentastra is a moth of the family Coleophoridae that can be found in Afghanistan, Turkmenistan, Turkey, and Uzbekistan.

The larvae feed on the flower buds, flowers and fruits of Artemisia turanica and Artemisia juncea. They initially live in a case made from inflorescences of wormwood, which is covered with leaflets until hibernation. The case is silky and the inner side consists of pieces of flower buds glued together. Full-grown larvae hibernate in cracks in the soil and under stones. The larvae can be found from September to October.

References

External links

amentastra
Moths of Asia
Moths described in 1972